Buwaning Island is an island located near Pitas district in Sabah, Malaysia.

See also
 List of islands of Malaysia

External links 
 Pulau Buwaning on geoview.info
 Pulau Buwaning on visitborneo.com

Islands of Sabah